Luke Haines is Dead is a three-disc boxed set containing various rarities, remixes, b-sides, unreleased material and classic tracks from The Auteurs, Baader Meinhof and Haines' solo work.

Track listing

Disc one
 "Das Capital Overture"  – 4:33
 "Bailed Out (Unreleased single)"  – 4:16
 "Showgirl"  – 3:03
 "Glad to Be Gone (B-Side)"  – 2:16
 "Staying Power (B-Side)"  – 3:32
 "Junk Shop Clothes (BBC session)"  – 3:09
 "She Might Take a Train (Limited edition single)"  – 2:26
 "Subculture (Limited edition single)"  – 2:46
 "Government Bookstore (BBC session)"  – 5:02
 "Housebreaker (Acoustic version)"  – 3:50
 "Valet Parking (Acoustic version)"  – 3:34
 "How Could I be Wrong" (Single version)  – 4:33
 "Starstruck (Live acoustic)"  – 4:16
 "Home Again Live acoustic)"  – 3:03
 "American Guitars"  – 2:16
 "Wedding Day (B-Side)"  – 3:32
 "High Diving Horses (B-Side)"  – 3:09
 "Lenny Valentino (Single recording)"  – 2:26
 "Disneyworld (B-Side)"  – 2:46
 "I'm a Rich Man's Toy"  – 5:02

Disc two
 "The Upper Classes (BBC session)"  – 4:33
 "Everything You Say Will Destroy You (BBC session)"  – 4:16
 "A Sister Like You"  – 3:03
 "Underground Movies (Alternate recording/French single)"  – 2:16
 "Brainchild (Alternate recording/French single)"  – 3:32
 "Chinese Bakery (BBC session)"  – 3:09
 "Modern History (B-Side)"  – 2:26
 "New French Girlfriend (BBC session)"  – 2:46
 "Light Aircraft On Fire (Single recording)"  – 5:02
 "Carcrash (B-Side)"  – 3:50
 "X Boogie Man (B-Side)"  – 3:34
 "New Brat In Town (Unreleased version)  – 4:33
 "Tombstone (Unreleased version)"  – 4:16
 "Back With The Killer Again (EP track)"  – 3:03
 "Unsolved Child Murder"  – 2:16
 "Former Fan (EP Track)"  – 3:32
 "Kenneth Anger's Bad Dream (EP track)"  – 3:09
 "Kids' Issue (BBC session/EP track)"  – 2:46
 "A New Life, A New Family (BBC session/EP track)"  – 5:02
 "Buddha (BBC session/EP track)"  – 2:46
 "After Murder Park (BBC session/EP track)"  – 5:02

Disc three
 "Baader Meinhof"  – 4:33
 "Meet Me At The Airport"  – 4:16
 "I've Been A Fool For You (Ltd Edition)"  – 3:03
 "Accident (Fuse remix)"  – 2:16
 "Mogadishu (Dalai Lama remix)"  – 3:32
 "ESP Kids (Unreleased)"  – 3:09
 "Future Generation (Unreleased version)"  – 2:26
 "Politic (Unreleased)"  – 2:46
 "Johnny and The Hurricanes (Bootboys out-take/Unreleased)"  – 5:02
 "The Rubettes"  – 3:50
 "Breaking Up Is Hard To Do (B-Side)"  – 3:34
 "Get Wrecked At Home (B-Side)"  – 4:33
 "Essex Bootboys (Bootboys Out-Take/Unreleased)"  – 4:16
 "Discomania (Alternate version/Unreleased)"  – 3:03
 "Couple Dancing (Unreleased)"  – 2:16
 "How To Hate The Working Classes"  – 3:32
 "The Oliver Twist Manifesto (Unreleased version)"  – 3:09
 "Never Work"  – 2:26
 "Skin Tight (From Film Showboy/Unreleased)"  – 2:46
 "Satan Wants Me"  – 5:02
 "The Mitford Sisters"  – 2:46
 "Bugger Bognor"  – 5:02

Luke Haines albums
Albums produced by Phil Vinall
2005 compilation albums